Saint Louis Blues  (French:Un Transport en Commun) is a 2009 film.

Synopsis 
Dakar, Senegal. Summer is coming to its end. During the journey from Dakar to Saint Louis, the fates of the passen.

External links 

2009 films
Senegalese drama films
French drama short films
Senegalese short films
2000s French films